Johann I Joseph (Johann Baptist Josef Adam Johann Nepomuk Aloys Franz de Paula; 26 June 1760 – 20 April 1836) was Prince of Liechtenstein between 1805 and 1806 and again from 1814 until 1836. He was the last Liechtenstein prince to rule under the Holy Roman Empire between 1805 and 1806 and as regent of Liechtenstein from 1806 until 1814. He was the fourth son of Franz Joseph I, Prince of Liechtenstein.

Early career

Liechtenstein chose a military career at age 22 and entered the army as a lieutenant in a cuirassier regiment. During the Austro-Turkish War (1788–1791) he earned, in rapid succession, promotion to Major, Oberstleutnant, and Oberst (colonel). He earned renown as a good cavalry officer and was honored with the Knight's Cross of the Military Order of Maria Theresa in 1790.

French Revolutionary Wars

During the French Revolutionary Wars, he participated in an "outstandingly effective cavalry action" at Avesnes-le-Sec on 12 September 1793, where 4,663 Republican troops suffered losses of 2,000 killed and wounded with the Allies losing only 69 men. In addition, 2,000 soldiers and 20 artillery pieces were captured. He also participated in many other battles. Soon after being promoted to General-Major in June 1794, he fought at the Battle of Fleurus. He commanded a mixed cavalry-infantry brigade in Anton Sztaray's division at the Battle of Würzburg on 3 September 1796. After this action he was awarded the Commander's Cross of the Order of Maria Theresa.

In the War of the Second Coalition, Liechtenstein commanded the Austrian Reserve at the Battle of Trebbia. In August 1799 he received promotion to Feldmarschal-Leutnant. He commanded 8,000 men in the successful siege of Cuneo in November and December. On 3 December 1800, he led a 5,109-man cavalry division in the Battle of Hohenlinden.

Napoleonic Wars

Liechtenstein was prominent in the Napoleonic Wars. At the Battle of Austerlitz, he led the 4,600 cavalry of the 5th Column. His troops fought well but he was unable to save the Austrian-Russian army from a disastrous defeat. Afterward, he carried on the negotiations with Emperor Napoleon I which concluded with the Peace of Pressburg. He earned the rank of General of Cavalry in 1808.

Throughout the War of the Fifth Coalition Liechtenstein commanded the I Reserve Korps in the army of Archduke Charles. He led his cavalry and grenadiers at the Battle of Eckmühl on 22 April 1809, the Battle of Aspern-Essling on 21–22 May, and the Battle of Wagram on 5–6 July. He took command of the main army after Archduke Charles resigned and held this responsibility until the end of the year. Emperor Francis II promoted him Feldmarschall in September. He negotiated and signed the Peace of Schönbrunn. Both of these treaties were very favourable to Napoleon and hard on Austria. Afterward, Liechtenstein was accused of having little diplomatic skill. To escape criticism he resigned from the military in 1810.

Sovereign

As Prince of Liechtenstein, Johann made forward-thinking reforms, but also had an absolutist governing style. In 1818 he granted a constitution, although it was limited in its nature. He expanded agriculture and forestry and radically reorganized  his administration, in an attempt to take the requirements of what was then a modern estate into account.

He proved a trendsetter in the area of garden art by planting Biedermeier gardens and park landscapes in an English model.

In 1806 Napoleon incorporated Liechtenstein in the Confederation of the Rhine and made it a sovereign state. At the Vienna Congress the sovereignty of Liechtenstein was approved. Liechtenstein became a member of the German Confederation in 1815. This membership confirmed Liechtenstein's sovereignty.

Marriage and issue
On 12 April 1792 in Vienna, he married Landgravine Josepha of Fürstenberg-Weitra (Vienna, 21 June 1776 – Vienna, 23 February 1848), Dame of the Imperial Court and Dame of the Order of the Starry Cross. They had 14 children:
 Princess Maria Leopoldine Josepha Sophia Aemiliana (Vienna, 11 September 1793 – Vienna, 28 July 1808)
 Princess Karoline (Vienna, 2 February 1795 – died in infancy)
 Aloys II, Prince of Liechtenstein (1796–1858)
 Princess Maria Sophie Josepha (Vienna, 5 September 1798 – Vienna, 27 June 1869), married in Vienna on 4 August 1817 Vincenz Graf Esterházy von Galántha (Pressburg, 25 October 1787 – Eisgrub, 19 October 1835), without issue
 Princess Maria Josepha (Vienna, 11 January 1800 – Vienna, 14 June 1884), unmarried and without issue
 Prince Franz de Paula of Liechtenstein (1802–1887), married Countess Julia Potocka and had issue. His great-grandson would eventually become Prince Franz Joseph II.
 Prince Karl Johann of Liechtenstein (1803–1871). Married Gräfin Rosalie d'Hemricourt von Grünne and had issue.
 Princess Klothilda Leopoldina Josepha (Vienna, 19 August 1804 – Vienna, 27 January 1807)
 Princess Henriette (Vienna, 1 April 1806 – Ischl, 15 June 1886), married in Vienna on 1 October 1825 Joseph Graf Hunyady von Kethély (Vienna, 13 January 1801 – Vienna, 9 March 1869), and had issue
 Prince Friedrich Adalbert (Vienna, 22 September 1807 – Vienna, 1 May 1885), 1,018th Knight of the Order of the Golden Fleece in Austria, married at Schloss Rosegg on 15 September 1848 Johanna Sophie Christiane Löwe (Oldenburg, 24 May 1815 – Pest, 28 November 1866), without issue
 Prince Eduard Franz of Liechtenstein (1809–1864). Married Countess Honoria Choloniowa-Choloniewska and had issue.
 Prince August Ludwig Ignaz (Vienna, 22 April 1810 – Vienna, 27 May 1824)
 Princess Ida Leopoldine Sophie Marie Josephine Franziska (Eisgrub, Moravia, 12 September 1811 – Vienna, 27 June 1884), Dame of the Imperial Court, Dame of the Order of the Starry Cross, married in Vienna on 30 July 1832 Karl 4th Fürst Paar von Hartberg und Krottenstein (Brieg, Silesia, 6 January 1806 – Vienna, 17 January 1881), Hereditary Grand-Master of the Posts of the Imperial Court, and had issue
 Prince Rudolf Maria Franz Placidus (Vienna, 5 October 1816 – Vicenza, 19 June 1848), unmarried and without issue

Honours
 :
 Knight of the Military Order of Maria Theresa, 19 December 1790; Commander, 1796; Grand Cross, 1801
 869th Knight of the Order of the Golden Fleece, 1801
 : Knight of the Order of St. George, 3rd Class, 7 October 1813

Footnotes

References
 "Costados", Gonçalo de Mesquita da Silveira de Vasconcelos e Sousa, Livraria Esquina, 1.ª Edição, Porto, 1997, N.º 106
 Arnold, James R. Marengo & Hohenlinden. Barnsley, South Yorkshire, UK: Pen & Sword, 2005. 
 Bowden, Scotty & Tarbox, Charlie. Armies on the Danube 1809. Arlington, Texas: Empire Games Press, 1980.
 Chandler, David. The Campaigns of Napoleon. New York: Macmillan, 1966.
 Smith, Digby. The Napoleonic Wars Data Book. London: Greenhill, 1998.

External links 

 Princely House of Liechtenstein
 J Liechtenstein by Digby Smith, compiled by Leopold Kudrna

1760 births
1836 deaths
Princes of Liechtenstein
18th-century Liechtenstein people
Field marshals of Austria
Austrian generals
Austrian soldiers
Austrian Empire military leaders of the French Revolutionary Wars
Military leaders of the French Revolutionary Wars
Austrian Empire commanders of the Napoleonic Wars
Generals of the Holy Roman Empire
Knights of the Golden Fleece of Austria
Grand Crosses of the Military Order of Maria Theresa
Recipients of the Order of St. George of the Third Degree